"A Good Kiss" is the sixth single by Belgian-Turkish singer Hadise.  It is also the first single from her expected second album Hadise. The song also featured in the drama movie "Vermist". The song has become her most successful song yet, as it is, currently, the only song to chart in both Belgium and Turkey.

The song was re-written into Turkish, by Turkish Pop legend Sezen Aksu, the Turkish version is entitled "Deli Oğlan", which also features on her second studio album as a bonus track. A music video was shot for "Deli Oğlan" and released on June 6, 2008.

Release history

Chart performance
The song entered the chart at 49.  It then fell off the chart for a week then re-entered and rose to peak at 28.  Charting for 8 weeks in total.

In Turkey "A Good Kiss" charted on the official billboard chart peaking at 6 on the 'Turkey Top 20' chart.

Charts

Track listing
Belgium CD & iTunes download (Europe)
"A Good Kiss (Radio Edit)"
"A Good Kiss (Club Mix)"
"A Good Kiss (Original Version)"

References

2007 singles
Hadise songs
English-language Belgian songs
Songs written by Yves Jongen
Songs written by Hadise
2007 songs
EMI Records singles